Odontostomidae is a taxonomic family of medium-sized to large, air-breathing, tropical and sub-tropical land snails, terrestrial pulmonate gastropod molluscs in the superfamily Orthalicoidea.

Taxonomy

2005 taxonomy 

This taxon was placed as the tribe Odontostomini, in the subfamily Bulimulinae, within the family Orthalicidae, according to the taxonomy of the Gastropoda (Bouchet & Rocroi, 2005).

2010 taxonomy 
Breure et al. (2010) elevated Odontostomini to Odontostomidae.

Genera 
Genera in the family Odontostomidae include:
 Anostoma Fischer von Waldheim, 1807 - synonym: Ringicella Gray, 1847 cf.
 Bahiensis Jousseaume, 1877
 Biotocus Salgado & Leme, 1990
 Bonnanius Jousseaume, 1900
 Clessinia Doering, 1874
 Cyclodontina Beck, 1837
 Digerus Haas, 1937 cf.
 Hyperaulax Pilsbry, 1897
 Moricandia Pilsbry & Vanatta, 1898
 Odontostomus Beck, 1837 - type genus of the tribe Odontostomini
 Plagiodontes Doering, 1876
 Spixia Pilsbry & Vanatta, 1898
 Tomigerus Spix, 1827

Description 
Species in tribe Odontostomini have the aperture obstructed by internal lamellae, folds or teeth (rarely absent by degeneration); the base is perforate 
or has an umbilical suture; and the genitalia are extremely lengthened. Jaw either plaited or solid.

Odontostomini is clearly a natural group of genera, confined to South America east of the Andes, and with the exception of some species, south of the Amazon. That the whole series had its inception in a form in which the characteristic apertural teeth had already been developed, is demonstrated by 
the fact that these lamella and folds are clearly homologous throughout the species of the several genera. It follows from this that the toothless forms, such as Moricandia, are secondarily so, by degeneration of the teeth of their ancestors. Many species show the various stages of tooth 
degeneration.

References
This article incorporates public domain text from the reference

External links 

 
Taxa named by Henry Augustus Pilsbry
Gastropod families